Emerald Isle is an interactive fiction game by Level 9 Computing released in 1984. A plane has crashed after being struck by a storm over the Bermuda Triangle. The sole occupant has escaped by parachute and finds himself on an unknown island inhabited by strange peoples and creatures.

Gameplay
The game is a standard text adventure with limited graphics on some platforms.

Reception
John Sweeney writing for Page 6 said: "For anyone who has not yet taken the plunge into adventuring, and can't afford to buy an Infocom adventure such as Wishbringer, Emerald Isle offers an excellent introduction to a very enjoyable pastime."

Reviews
Crash! - May, 1985
Sinclair Programs - May, 1985
Zzap! - May, 1985
Computer and Video Games - May, 1985
Sinclair User - May, 1985
Popular Computing Weekly - Apr 04, 1985
Tilt - Jul, 1986
Computer Gamer - Apr, 1985

References

External links 
 Emerald Isle at Lemon 64
 
 

1980s interactive fiction
1984 video games
Amstrad CPC games
Atari 8-bit family games
BBC Micro and Acorn Electron games
Commodore 64 games
Level 9 Computing games
MSX games
Video games developed in the United Kingdom
ZX Spectrum games